Charged multivesicular body protein 1a is a protein that in humans is encoded by the CHMP1A gene.

Function 

This gene encodes a member of the CHMP/Chmp family of proteins which are involved in multivesicular body sorting of proteins to the interiors of lysosomes. The initial prediction of the protein sequence encoded by this gene suggested that the encoded protein was a metallopeptidase. The nomenclature has been updated recently to reflect the correct biological function of this encoded protein.

Interactions 

CHMP1A has been shown to interact with VPS4A.

References

External links

Further reading